The National IT Industry Promotion Agency or NIPA is an IT industry promotion organization operated by the Government of South Korea.

External links
NIPA English Website

Economy of South Korea